Ahmed Idris  (known as Ahmed Idris Wase; born 1 June 1964) is a Nigerian politician who serves as the Deputy Speaker of the 9th Nigerian House of Representatives. He is a member of All Progressive Congress

Education and personal life
Idris attended LSB Primary School Bashar in Wase, Plateau, Government Secondary school Mbar, Government Secondary school Dengi, Plateau State Polytechnic, Kaduna Polytechnic and Harvard Kennedy School of Government United States.

Non-political offices 

Civil & Maintenance, Works Dept. C.O.E., Gindiri Member.
Sub-Establishment Committee, C.O.E., Gindiri.
Chairman, Non-Academic Staff Union, C.O.E., Gindiri (1989–1994).
Chairman, Senior Staff Welfare Committee (1990–1993).
Chairman, Joint Academic & Non-Academic Staff Union of Plateau State Tertiary Institutions (1992–1994).
President, Civil Eng. Students Asso., Kaduna Poly Branch (1994–1995).
Dir. Of organization, Gamji Memorial Club, KadPoly Branch (1994–1995).
Chairman, Non-Academic Staff Union, Plateau State Council (1999–2002).

Political career
Deputy House Leader of the Federal House of Representatives, 2018–2019.
Member of the Federal Government Delegation to the 89th Session of the United Nations General Assembly held in New York, United States, 2016.
Governing Council Member of the National Institute of Legislative and Democratic Studies (NILDS), 2015.
Member into the Federal House of Representatives in Nigeria, 2007- 
Executive Secretary of State Pilgrims Board, Plateau State, 2005–2006
Ahmed Wase was elected into the lower Chamber of the National Assembly in 2007 and is currently serving his fourth term as a member of House of Representatives, Wase Federal Constituency. He worked in the following committees as Member House Of Representatives: Federal Character, Environment, Emergency & Disaster, Public Account, Area Council, Housing and Habitat, Capital Market, Poverty Alleviation, Petroleum (Upstream), Justice, Public Petitions and Labour, and Youth and Employment Head of Section.

He was elected Deputy speaker in 9th National Assembly, House of Representative, with 358 votes unopposed.

Awards
 Commander of the Order of the Niger
 Best Legislator in Plateau State- Plateau State Award Committee
 Award for Excellence by Centre for Values and Ethics
 Leadership Excellence Award by University of Jos
 In October 2022, a Nigerian national honour of Commander of the Order of the Niger (CON) was conferred on him by President Muhammadu Buhari.

References

External links
http://ahmedidriswase4speaker.com.ng/about-us/personal website. 
https://www.shineyoureye.org/person/ahmed-idris-maje/ 

Living people
Nigerian Muslims
Members of the House of Representatives (Nigeria)
1964 births